Spring Church is an unincorporated community in Armstrong County, Pennsylvania, United States. Spring Church has a post office, with ZIP code 15686.

References

Unincorporated communities in Armstrong County, Pennsylvania
Unincorporated communities in Pennsylvania